Funeral for a Friend are a Welsh post-hardcore band.

Funeral for a Friend may also refer to:
 "Funeral for a Friend/Love Lies Bleeding", two songs by Elton John
 Funeral for a Friend (comics), a story arc in The Death of Superman
 "Funeral for a Friend" (The Flash), an episode of The Flash